Christopher Stephen Povak (born November 26, 1970) is a United States Space Force major general who serves as the deputy director of the National Reconnaissance Office and commander of the Space Force Element to the National Reconnaissance Office. He previously served as the deputy director of the Space Warfighting Analysis Center.

Povak received his commission from Clarkson University in 1992. In September 2022, he was nominated for promotion to major general.

Education
 1992 Bachelor of Science, Electrical Engineering, Clarkson University, Potsdam, N.Y.
 1997 Undergraduate Space and Missile Training, Vandenberg Air Force Base, Calif.
 1998 Master of Science, Electrical Engineering, Colorado Technical University, Colo.
 1999 Squadron Officer School, Distinguished Graduate, Maxwell AFB, Ala.
 2003 Air Command and Staff College, Maxwell AFB, Ala., by correspondence
 2005 Master of Arts, Military Operational Art and Science, Air University, Maxwell AFB, Ala.
 2005 Air Command and Staff College, Distinguished Graduate, Maxwell AFB, Ala.
 2007 Air War College, Maxwell AFB, Ala., by correspondence
 2011 Senior Executive Fellowship, Harvard University, Cambridge, Mass.
 2012 National War College, Fort Lesley J. McNair, Washington, D.C.
 2012 Master of Science, National Security Strategy, National War College, National Defense University, Fort Lesley J. McNair, Washington, D.C.

Assignments

1. March 1993–July 1996, Air Force Satellite Control Network Capacity Engineer, 50th Space Wing Plans, Schriever Air Force Base, Colo.
2. August 1996–August 1997, Flight Commander, Operating Division 4/DC, Onizuka Air Force Station, Calif.
3. September 1997–May 2000, Chief, Space Systems Engineering, Operating Division 4/DC, Onizuka AFS, Calif.
4. June 2000–May 2002, Director of Operations, Air Force Operations Element, Washington, D.C.
5. June 2002–August 2003, Director of Engineering, Air Force Operations Element, Washington, D.C.
6. September 2003–July 2004, Congressional Fellow, Office of Senator Joseph I. Lieberman, Washington, D.C.
7. August 2004–June 2005, Student, Air Command and Staff College, Maxwell AFB, Ala.
8. June 2005–July 2006, Chief, Space Programs Planning, Programming, and Budgeting, Directorate of Space Acquisition, Headquarters U.S. Air Force, the Pentagon, Arlington, Va.
9. August 2006–July 2007, Chief, Congressional and Media Affairs Branch, Directorate of Space Acquisition, Headquarters U.S. Air Force, the Pentagon, Arlington, Va.
10. August 2007–June 2008, Program Element Monitor, Transformational Satellite Communications, Directorate of Space Acquisition, Headquarters U.S. Air Force, the Pentagon, Arlington, Va.
11. July 2008–June 2010, Commander, Operations Division 7 and Deputy Chief Overhead Collection Management Center, Fort George G. Meade, Md.
12. July 2010–July 2011, Executive Officer to the Deputy Director, National Reconnaissance Office, Chantilly, Va.
13. August 2011–June 2012, Student, National War College, Fort Lesley J. McNair, Washington, D. C.
14. July 2012–July 2015, Commander, Air Force Element, RAF Menwith Hill, United Kingdom
15. August 2015–May 2016, Deputy Director, Mission Operations Directorate, National Reconnaissance Office, Chantilly, Va.
16. June 2016–August 2019, Commander, Aerospace Data Facility Colorado, Buckley AFB, Colo.
17. June 2016–August 2019, Commander, Air Force Element Space Operations Wing, Buckley AFB, Colo. (December 2018–June 2019, Acting Commander, Air Force Element, NRO, Chantilly, Va.)
18. September 2019 – July 2021, Deputy Commander, Joint Task Force Space Defense, Schriever AFB, Colo
19. July 2021 – September 2022, Deputy Director, Space Warfighting Analysis Center, Washington D.C.
20. September 2022- present, Deputy Director and Space Force Element Commander, National Reconnaissance Office, Chantilly, Va.

Awards and decorations
Povak is the recipient of the following awards:

Dates of promotion

References

Living people
United States Air Force generals
United States Space Force generals
1970 births